Kay Madsen (27 November 1902 – 6 June 1979) was a Danish footballer. He played in one match for the Denmark national football team against Germany in 1928 that resulted in a 2-1 victory for Germany.

References

External links
 

1902 births
1979 deaths
Danish men's footballers
Denmark international footballers
Place of birth missing
Association footballers not categorized by position